Big Bang are a British electronic music duo that formed in the late 1980s. The band consists of Laurence Malice (founder of Trade nightclub) and writer Iain Williams. Based in London, the duo were signed to Swanyard Records and spearheaded the music genre known as big beat.

Musical history

1988: Formation and early years

Big Bang were formed during the latter part of 1988.

From 1986–1988, Malice and Williams had previously been in a band together called 'You You You' along with the vocalist Karen O'Connor and backing vocalist Alice Shaw. By late 1986, a new clique of club bands were starting to make an impression in Europe and Scandinavia, bands that were rediscovering and embracing the past and taking it forward onto a different level; Army of Lovers in Sweden, 'Angel' in London, Desireless in France, were all examples. 'You You You' were part of this renaissance.

You You You gave their first concert at a secret location in Charing Cross Road, London, in early January 1987. So secret was the concert, members of the band have since forgotten where the venue was. The show was arranged as an unannounced warm-up gig before their debut at the Camden Palace on 13 January. The band billed their first series of concerts as 'Stage 1' of their 'World Domination Tour' and enlisted the help of illustrator Mark Wardel to design their publicity. Their appearance at the Camden Palace attracted over 1,000 people on what the Met Office recorded as one of England's coldest nights of the 20th century.

You You You built up a strong following performing concerts on the club scene including three nights at the Hippodrome, London (23 January, 9 February and 6 April), a show at Fabrice Emaer's Le Palace in Paris, which the performance artist Leigh Bowery hosted, and performances at The Fridge in Brixton where they appeared on stage on a huge white staircase with a troupe of synchronised dancers (filmed for Japanese TV), at Anarchy Club at London Astoria, at The Zap Club in Brighton (as part of the event 'Return of the Django goes to Brighton' on 18 April), at Paradise Lost in Watford, and at The Limelight. The band received an invitation to appear at The Party—a benefit concert held at Wembley Arena on 1 April to help fund AIDS research and awareness. It was the first such concert held.On the bill were some of the best known names in the music industry including Elton John, George Michael, Bob Geldof, Meat Loaf, Ben E. King and Kim Wilde. The show was televised to over 100 million viewers worldwide. Due to the volume of acts who performed at the event, You You You were allotted an appearance at the After-Party show held at a theatre in London's West End. The band appeared on stage alongside several pop stars including George Michael, members from the cast of TV's Coronation Street and EastEnders and performers from several West End musicals including 42nd Street (musical) and Nunsense.

On 2 June 1987 during the runup to the general election, Karen O'Connor co-starred as the magician's assistant in the Conservative Party (UK)’s Election Broadcast that was aired across national UK TV stations. The 8.44-minute film was part of Saatchi & Saatchi's marketing campaign to help re-elect the Conservative Party. On 12 July, You You You made a guest appearance on the Channel 4 TV show Network 7. Their pop video for Head Over Heels directed by Steven Chivers was premiered on the show and O'Connor was interviewed by presenter Magenta Devine inside a specially built caravan. On 17 December, You You You gave a special Christmas Show at the Hippodrome, London, their 4th appearance at the venue that year.

In February 1988, You You You signed a deal with Orinoco to record a single for Major Productions under the guidance of Orinoco Studios owner Tom Astor. The Lager Brothers—Ken Thomas and Zeke Manyika (from the band Orange Juice)—produced two tracks with the band. In July the project came to a halt after O'Connor quit the band to concentrate on her acting career. Soon after the split Malice and Williams created Big Bang as a duo using session vocalists for recordings and live performances. The single You You You recorded titled How Can This be Love was never released.

Prior to You You You, Malice had hosted the Pyramid Club at Heaven nightclub, London and Williams had been a solo artist and model, as well as a member of several London-based bands including 'Dance on a Telephone' and 'One by One' (with whom he recorded the single I Kept My Promise released in 1984 on Discovery Records.)

In January 1984, Williams recorded the dance track Love Is Suicide at Trident Studios in Soho, London, under the provisional title Iain Williams & the 1984 Project. The track was penned by Williams and co-produced by Fiachra Trench and Iain Williams. The 9-minute recording based on repetitive chord structures was an experiment in producing a rhythmic, minimalistic dance track aimed specifically for the dance clubs.

The musicians which appeared on the recording included Hans Zimmer (on Fairlight CMI synth and LinnDrum), guitarist Alan Murphy (later of the band Level 42), lead vocals by Lelo (of the band Lelo and the Levants), with backing vocals by Shirley and Dee Lewis, and the Trident Studio grand piano (on which Rick Wakeman played on David Bowie's recording of 'Life On Mars') was played by Iain Williams. In 1985, Williams produced and co-wrote the single The Boys Were There released on the Fridge nightclub's indie label, Latex Records, for London-based performance artiste Yvette the Conqueror.

1989: Swanyard Records,Voulez-Vous and big beat

Big Bang signed to Swanyard Records at the start of 1989. The label was founded by Margarita Hamilton owner of Walton Castle and Big Bang were the first artist to be signed to it. They released their first record on Swanyard Records (SYRTR 1) in June 1989, an Arabic inspired version of ABBA's Voulez-Vous b-side Cold Nights In Cairo. It reached #101 in the BBC national chart. The single was produced by Big Bang and Steev Toth. Both 7" and 12" versions (plus an 'Imagine Mix' 12" extended version) were released. The band used session vocalists on all their recordings. Lead vocals on Voulez-Vous were shared by Jasmine Duggan (Ventura) and Teresa Revill and backing vocals were shared by Williams and Malice. Duran Duran guitarist Andy Taylor played guitar on the track. A 12" white label had previously been released several months earlier. Mixed by Democratic 3, 'Voulez-Vous' (Democratic 3 Mix) reached #1 in certain club charts throughout the UK and #27 in a Record Mirror chart. Also, a 'Voulez-Vous (Rare mix)' was distributed specifically to dance clubs. The single also charted at #14 in London's 1989 end of year club chart.

It was Iain Williams who coined the musical term big beat to describe the band's sound and explained the concept during an interview with the journalist Alex Gerry for an article in the London magazine Metropolitan (issue 132, page 9, 6 June 1989) under the heading, 'Big Bang in Clubland. Could Big Beat be the 1989 answer to Acid House?'. Big Bang's sound consisted of various experimental musical elements including heavy hard rock drum beats and synthesizer-generated loops as well as an added suggestion of European influences that at times had a trance-like quality. Their agent 10 x Better released a press release detailing their musical influences that included Dalida, Warda Al-Jazairia, ABBA, Tamla Motown and 70s Euro disco. Big Bang always stated Cold Nights In Cairo gave a better impression of the big beat sound they were aiming for than their recording of Voulez-Vous did. Club DJs picked up on this and both tracks became club floor-fillers. The concept of the big beat sound was later picked up on and adapted by many club DJs and went on to become widely used by many successful musicians throughout the 1990s.

1989: Arabic Circus Tour

During 1989, Big Bang performed several concerts to publicise the release of Voulez-Vous with their lavish Arabic Circus Tour that consisted of various circus acts including acrobats, one-wheel bicycle riders, fire-eaters, jugglers, flying trapeze artists and a belly-dancing troupe. Big Bang were joined on stage by the vocalists Teresa Revill and Jasmine Ventura.   Shows were performed at the Hippodrome in London's Leicester Square where Steve Strange hosted the night and it was said Grace Jones threatened to jump on stage to upstage the band and at the Paramount City in Soho (formerly the Windmill Theatre), at the Hammersmith Palais in Hammersmith, and at Heaven nightclub with DJ's Mark Moore (creator of the band S'Express) and Colin Faver who on his Myspace page cites Big Bang as being one of his many musical influences. The Arabic Circus Tour also performed at a special Ball held in a massive disused West London warehouse hosted by the performance artist Leigh Bowery with experimental musician/vocalist Danielle Dax and American punk singer and former Andy Warhol protégé Jayne County appearing as supporting artists on the bill.

1990–91: Recording their album & the International Song Festival
1990: Throughout 1990 Big Bang concentrated on writing and recording new material with the intention of releasing an album. In October Laurence Malice opened Trade nightclub at Turnmills in London. Trade was the first all-night after-hours nightclub in Britain.

Also in 1990, Malice had a guest appearance in the Dead or Alive video for their single "Your Sweetness (Is Your Weakness)" from their album Fan the Flame (Part 1). Malice appears in drag playing a cello in the nightclub scenes.

On 16 November 1990, Big Bang accompanied by vocalist Jasmine Duggan (Ventura) were flown over to Ireland to represent the United Kingdom in the 13th International Song Festival where they performed their self-penned song One More Chance. It was the first time the song had been heard in public. The festival was held in Cavan over two days. It was compered by the Irish commentators George Hamilton and Larry Gogan. The Romanian singer Ricky Dandel gave a guest performance during the festival. The final was held on 17 November. The Earl Gill Orchestra accompanied Big Bang on stage. Malta won the contest and Big Bang came second in the competition and first for their performance.

Upon their return to London, Big Bang parted company with Swanyard Records over musical differences. The band immediately secured interest from London Records who commissioned them to record a single at The Music Station in Fulham. With a new producer at the helm, Big Bang laid down the backing track to One More Chance.

1991: Although Big Bang never officially disbanded, at the tail end of 1991 Malice and Williams decided to concentrate on their careers away from the band. The new material they wrote and recorded for their intended album titled 'Theory' was never released.

In 2008, one week before Malice's club Trade closed its doors for the final time, Malice was interviewed live on Gaydar Radio by Dj Gary H in a two-hour, two-part documentary in which he talks about his music career, Trade, and his clubbing history, and how it all started, the highs and lows, and everything else in between.

July 2012: Big Bang—Voulez-Vous 2012 the 'Rare Mix' 12" version was uploaded onto SoundCloud.

2013: I Really Miss U
Big Bang - "I Really Miss U" (ft. Teresa Revill)

On 26 August 2013, Big Bang issued a press statement announcing the release of their first single in over two decades. The 'emphatically catchy' I Really Miss U features lead vocals by Teresa Revill. The single was released on 26 August 2013. The 'media' immediately dubbed it a 'nu-disco' track. A lyric video to accompany the song can be seen on YouTube.

2014: Arabic Circus // The Dawn Rising (EP)
On 1 July 2014, Big Bang announced via their website that they were releasing a new six-track EP (extended play).
Arabic Circus // The Dawn Rising as Big Bang's first EP and is a collection of songs/tracks taken from the soundtrack to their Arabic Circus. It is 21 minutes in length. On 2 July, Big Bang released a promotional video short on their website and YouTube to accompany the EP's release, using a remixed version The Symphonic Mix of their track Trail of the Bedouins to accompany the video soundtrack.

Arabic Circus // The Dawn Rising track listing

Arabic Circus // The Dawn Rising - release history
Arabic Circus // The Dawn Rising was released on WM Records in various countries worldwide in 2014.

2015-present

Destiny by Francon
In 2015, Iain Williams released the song "Destiny" under the alias FRANCON with featured vocals by Keith Pemberton. 'Destiny' is co-written by Williams and Monty Norman and contains the famous four-chord progression from Norman's James Bond Theme within the song. The video that accompanied the song's release was filmed in Worthing, West Sussex, and uses interior shots filmed in the unique Dome Cinema, Worthing. A 'Destiny' (Instrumental) JB-007 MIX was also released.

On 28 July 2016, it was reported that Alice Shaw (the former backing vocalist in the band You You You) committed suicide on 27 July 2016.

Discography

Music videos

Tours
 You You You – 'Stage I' World Domination Tour (1987)
 Big Bang – Arabic Circus Tour (1989)

Band members timeline
You You You / Big Bang

Timeline

Further reading
 Hoy, Rory. The Little Big Beat Book, published 10 September 2018, New Haven Publishing Ltd, pages 48–50, outlines Big Bang's involvement in the development of Big Beat as a musical genre and charts the history of Big Beat.
 Hoy, Rory. The Story of Big Beat: Bookazine, published 30 July 2019, New Haven Publishing Ltd, 
 Jones, Dylan. Sweet Dreams, Faber (2020) , Karen O’Connor interviewed re: her life in London, pages 92–93, 177, 634, 674: Sweet Dreams

References

External links
 You You You (Band) 1987-1988 official archive: Images and press cuttings of the UK band detailing their 1987 'Stage 1' World Domination Tour, and history.
 Big Bang discography:
 Big Bang: Arabic Circus//The Dawn Rising:
 Big Bang: Arabic Circus//The Dawn Rising – Credits:
 Love Is Suicide by Iain Williams & the 1984 Project

Alternative dance musical groups
Big beat groups
English electronic music duos
English synth-pop groups
Musical groups established in 1988
Musical groups from London
Nu-disco musicians